Pete's Eats is a cafe in Llanberis, North Wales, popular amongst walkers and climbers in the Snowdonia region of mountains. Llanberis, at the foot of Snowdon, is one of the traditional starting points for climbs in the Snowdonia National Park. The cafe has long been an important centre for climbers, described as "one of the most famous mountaineering hangouts in Britain". It even received a small mention in the New York Times as "cheap and filling" and "rowdy fun".

History
Pete's Eats opened in August 1978, taking its name from Peter Norton, its proprietor.

The building was refurbished in 2002, taking over the adjoining building 
to create much-needed space downstairs and adding a hotel, showers, and library.

See also
Jimmy Jewell (climber)

References

External links

Llanberis
Restaurants in Gwynedd
Tourism in Gwynedd